Ron McLean (1943–1983) was an Australian screenwriter, producer and executive producer, best known for his work on TV. He wrote most of the episodes for Spyforce, which he helped create. He had a long collaboration with producer Roger Mirams.

Biography
McLean was running a woman's shoe shop in Double Bay, Sydney when he read an article about a TV series being made in Australia, Riptide (1969). He sent them a couple of stories which the show liked and he taught himself how to adapt them into scripts. He wrote some episodes of Skippy and did sketches for The Mavis Bramston Show. He came much in demand in the early 70s, writing a number of shows for Crawford Productions.

McLean met Roger Mirans when working on Woobinda, Animal Doctor. The two formed a company, South Pacific Films, which made Spyforce.

McLean was also one of a team of four people who wrote children's books under the name of Mary Elliott.

In the early 1980s he set up Ron McLean Productions which produced Airhawk, The Little Fella and Outbreak of Hostilities. The company went into liquidation in 1982.

Personal life
McLean Married to, Elizabeth, and together they have three daughters, Sara, Sallie Samantha and son Steven.

Select credits
Skippy the Bush Kangaroo (1969) (TV series) – writer
Riptide (1969) (TV series) – writer
The Mavis Bramston Show (TV series) – writer
Good Morning Mr Doubleday (1969) (TV series) – writer
Woobinda, Animal Doctor (1969–70) (TV series) – writer
The Galloping Gourmet (TV series) – writer
The Rovers (1969–70) (TV series) – writer, script editor
Homicide (1970–71) (TV series) – writer – episodes include "The Cat", "Flash Johnny", "Juliet"
Spyforce (1971–72) (TV series) – co-creator, associate producer, writer
Barrier Reef (1972) (TV series) – writer
Ryan (1973) (TV series) – writer
Division Four (1973) (TV series) – writer
Silent Number (1974–76) (TV series) – creator, writer, co-producer, director of episode
Certain Women (TV series) – writer
The Evil Touch (1974) (TV series) – writer
Human Target (1974) (TV movie) – writer, producer
Number 96 (TV series) – writer
Delta (TV series) – writer
Case for the Defence (1978) (TV series) – writer, co-producer
Secret Doors (TV series) – writer
King's Men (1976–79) (TV series) – creator, writer
Glenview High (1977–79) (TV series) – writer, producer
Night Nurse (1978) (TV movie) – writer
Chopper Squad (1978) (TV series) – writer
Prisoner: Cell Block H (1979) (TV series) – writer
The Young Doctors (TV series) – writer
Airhawk (1981) (aka Star of the North) (TV movie) – writer, co-producer
Bellamy (1981) (TV series) – creator, writer
Island Trader (1982) (TV movie) – writer
Outbreak of Hostilities (1983) (TV movie) – writer, co-producer
The Little Feller (1983) (TV movie) – writer, co-producer
Innocent Prey (1984) – writer

Books as "Mary Elliot"
Clare Carson and the Sheep Duffers : Bush Nurse in the Australian Outback Hawthorn : Lloyd O'Neil, 1970
Clare Carson and the Gold Rush : Bush Nurse in the Australian Outback Adelaide : Rigby, 1970 
Clare Carson at Wilga Junction : Bush Nurse in the Australian Outback, Adelaide : Rigby, 1970
Clare Carson and the Runaways : Bush Nurse in the Australian Outback Adelaide : Rigby, 1970

References

External links
Ron McLean at National Film and Sound Archive

Ron McLean at AustLit

1983 deaths
Australian screenwriters
1943 births
20th-century Australian screenwriters